Salsabil (romanized as , , , ,) is an Arabic term referring to a spring or fountain in paradise, mentioned in the Qur'an and in some hadiths. The term is also used as a common and proper noun.

In the Quran
In the Quran, the word is used once, to refer to a spring or fountain in paradise (Jannah). The sole quranic reference is in sura Al-Insan. There is also mention in some hadith.

The verse may be in reference to the previous verse concerning the drink provided to those who enter paradise. "Salsabil" is usually but not always considered to be used as a proper noun, not a common noun, in this verse (that is, the capitalized name of one specific water source). The common noun is used in Hindustani to mean "[r]unning limpid, sweet water", and in Persian for a pleasant beverage.

Derivations
The Qur'anic term is probably the source of the engineering use of "salsabil", to mean a device for aerating drinking water in a sebil. The word is also used to refer to the same type of water feature used for evaporative cooling.

Like many terms found in the Quran, it is used as a proper name given to people, as both a personal or as a family name. It is also the name of one of the old neighborhoods in Tehran, Iran.

See also
Salsabil (fountain) (for cooling)
Sebil (for drinking)
Shadirvan (for wudu, ablutions)

References

Quranic words and phrases
Sacred springs